Bulgaria competed at the 1968 Summer Olympics in Mexico City, Mexico. 112 competitors, 102 men and 10 women, took part in 69 events in 13 sports.

Medalists

Gold
 Petar Kirov — Wrestling, Men's Greco-Roman Flyweight
 Boyan Radev — Wrestling, Men's Greco-Roman Light Heavyweight

Silver
 Tsvetan Dimitrov, Yancho Dimitrov, Asparukh Donev, Milko Gaydarski, Ivailo Georgiyev, Atanas Gerov, Mikhail Gionin, Georgi Ivanov, Kiril Ivkov, Atanas Khristov, Georgi Khristakiev, Kiril Khristov, Todor Nikolov, Georgi Vasiliev, Yevgeny Yanchovsky, Stoyan Yordanov, Ivan Zafirov, and Petar Zhekov — Football (soccer), Men's Team Competition
 Enyu Todorov — Wrestling, Men's Freestyle Featherweight
 Enyu Valchev — Wrestling, Men's Freestyle Lightweight
 Osman Duraliev — Wrestling, Men's Freestyle Heavyweight

Bronze
 Ivan Mihailov — Boxing, Men's Featherweight
 Georgi Stankov — Boxing, Men's Light Heavyweight
 Prodan Gardzhev — Wrestling, Men's Freestyle Middleweight

Athletics

Men
Track & road events

Field events

Combined events – Decathlon

Women
Track & road events

Field events

Combined events – Pentathlon

Basketball

Preliminary round

Group B

October 13

October 14

October 15

October 16

October 18

October 19

October 20

9th–12th Place
October 23

9th–10th Place
October 24

Boxing

Men

Canoeing

Sprint
Men

Football

First round

Group D

Quarter-finals

Bulgaria progressed after a drawing of lots.

Semi-finals

Gold Medal match

Gymnastics

Modern pentathlon

Three male pentathletes represented Bulgaria in 1968.

Men's Individual Competition:
 Antoni Panyovski – 4247 points (→ 33rd place)
 Konstantin Sardzhev – 4191 points (→ 36th place)
 Ivan Apostolov – 3462 points (→ 45th place)

Men's Team Competition:
 Paniowsky, Sardjev, and Apostolov – 11976 points (→ 11th place)

Rowing

Men

Shooting

Six shooters, all men, represented Bulgaria in 1968.
Open

Swimming

Men

Women

Volleyball

Round robin

|}

|}

Weightlifting

Men

Wrestling

References

Nations at the 1968 Summer Olympics
1968
1968 in Bulgarian sport